Lieutenant, Junior Grade  Megan Austin (USN), is a main character from the first season of the television series JAG portrayed by actress Tracey Needham.

Character Biography
Meg Austin was the second partner to Lieutenant Harmon Rabb, replacing then Lieutenant JG Caitlin Pike. She is from Texas and inherited a friendship from her deceased father, an obscure character very well connected in the intelligence community named "Ollie" in clear reference to Oliver North (portrayed by himself on three episodes in 1995, 1996 and 2002), who knew her father and who helped her on some of their investigations. She also proved to have superior computer skills to both Rabb and Kate due to a previous stint in weapons and computer R&D. We also find out in her first episode that she has extreme claustrophobia (fear of confined spaces), which was a continual problem for her character. After her departure from JAG headquarters, she also recommended that Bud be placed on JAG staff.

Awards and decorations
The list below contains Austin's known awards current as of the end of season 1. The names are given in order of precedence, according to SECNAVINST 1650.1F and the U.S. Navy Uniform Regulations (NAVPERS 1566.5G).

Background
The executives at NBC didn't like Andrea Parker's character (Caitlin Pike) in the pilot, so they had to recast Rabb's partner for the series. Andrea Parker went on to work on The Pretender but came back to guest star on a few episodes later in the season.

When JAG was cancelled by NBC after the first season, Needham left the series. When CBS picked up JAG from the second season onward, she was replaced by Catherine Bell, playing then Major Sarah MacKenzie. Her final, non-flashback appearance was in the final and rarely aired season 1 episode Skeleton Crew.

Austin also appeared via flashback in seasons 3 and 9.

References

JAG (TV series) characters
Television characters introduced in 1995
Fictional United States Navy personnel
Fictional American lawyers
Fictional United States Navy officers